Neville Hewitt may refer to:

 Nev Hewitt (1920–2016), Member of the Queensland Legislative Assembly
 Neville Hewitt (American football) (born 1993), American football inside linebacker